Mario Vrančić (born 23 May 1989) is a Bosnian professional footballer who plays as a midfielder for Bosnian Premier League club Sarajevo, on loan from Rijeka.

Vrančić started his professional career at Mainz 05, playing mainly in its reserve team. In 2009, he was sent on loan to Rot Weiss Ahlen. Two years later, he joined Borussia Dortmund II. The following year, he moved to SC Paderborn. Vrančić switched to Darmstadt 98 in 2015. In 2017, he was transferred to Norwich City. Four years later, Vrančić signed with Stoke City, who loaned him to Rijeka in 2022. In 2023, he signed with Rijeka, who then loaned him to Sarajevo.

A former German youth international, Vrančić made his senior international debut for Bosnia and Herzegovina in 2015, earning 6 caps until 2017.

Club career

Early career
Vrančić started playing football at a local club, before joining youth academy of Mainz 05 in 2004. He made his professional debut with Mainz 05 II in 2006 at the age of 17. In June 2009, he was sent on a season-long loan to Rot Weiss Ahlen.

In January 2011, he moved to Borussia Dortmund II.

SC Paderborn
In May 2012, Vrančić signed a two-year deal with SC Paderborn. He made his official debut for the team on 3 August against Hertha BSC. On 11 August, he scored a brace in a triumph over VfL Bochum, which were his first goals for the side.

Vrančić was instrumental in SC Paderborn's first ever promotion to Bundesliga, which was sealed on 11 May 2014. He scored 5 goals and added 9 assists. The following day, he signed a new two-year contract with the team.

Darmstadt 98
In June 2015, Vrančić was transferred to Darmstadt 98 for an undisclosed fee. He made his competitive debut for the club in DFB-Pokal game against TuS Erndtebrück on 7 August. Two weeks later, he made his league debut against Schalke 04. On 12 March 2016, he scored his first goal for Darmstadt 98 against FC Augsburg.

Norwich City
In June 2017, Vrančić joined English outfit Norwich City on a three-year deal. He debuted officially for the team on 5 August against Fulham. On 19 September, he scored a brace in EFL Cup game against Brentford, his first goals for the side. Six months later, he scored his first league goal in a defeat of Reading.

Vrančić was an important piece in Norwich City's conquest of Championship title, his first trophy with the club, which was secured on 5 May 2019 and earned them promotion to Premier League. He had an impact of 10 goals and 7 assists. In July, he extended his contract until June 2021.

Vrančić scored his first Premier League goal against Tottenham Hotspur on 28 December. He played his 100th game for the side in a loss to Manchester City on 26 July 2020.

Stoke City
In July 2021, Vrančić moved to Stoke City on a one-year deal. He made his debut on 7 August 2021 in a 3–2 victory against Reading. On 25 September 2021, he scored his first goal for Stoke against Hull City. He scored in victories over Peterborough United and Queens Park Rangers. In May 2022, he signed a one-year contract extension. Vrančić made 35 appearances for Stoke in 2021–22 as the team finished in 14th position.

Rijeka
On 18 June 2022, Vrančić signed for Croatian side Rijeka on loan for the 2022–23 season. He permanently signed for Rijeka in February 2023, being afterwards loaned to Bosnian Premier League side Sarajevo.

International career
Despite representing Germany at various youth levels, with whom he won the 2008 UEFA European Under-19 Football Championship, Vrančić decided to play for Bosnia and Herzegovina at senior level.

In June 2015, his request to change sports citizenship from German to Bosnian was approved by FIFA. Subsequently, he received his first senior call-up in August 2015, for UEFA Euro 2016 qualifiers against Belgium and Andorra. He debuted against the latter on 6 September.

Personal life
Vrančić's older brother Damir is also a professional footballer.

Career statistics

Club

International

Honours
Norwich City
Championship: 2018–19, 2020–21

Germany U19
UEFA European Under-19 Championship: 2008

References

External links

1989 births
Living people
Sportspeople from Slavonski Brod
Bosnia and Herzegovina refugees
Bosnia and Herzegovina emigrants to Germany
Citizens of Bosnia and Herzegovina through descent
Naturalized citizens of Germany
German footballers
Germany youth international footballers
German expatriate footballers
Bosnia and Herzegovina footballers
Bosnia and Herzegovina international footballers
Bosnia and Herzegovina expatriate footballers
Association football midfielders
1. FSV Mainz 05 II players
1. FSV Mainz 05 players
Rot Weiss Ahlen players
Borussia Dortmund II players
SC Paderborn 07 players
SV Darmstadt 98 players
Norwich City F.C. players
Stoke City F.C. players
HNK Rijeka players
FK Sarajevo players
Oberliga (football) players
Bundesliga players
2. Bundesliga players
Regionalliga players
English Football League players
Premier League players
Croatian Football League players
Premier League of Bosnia and Herzegovina players
Expatriate footballers in Germany
Expatriate footballers in England
German expatriate sportspeople in England
Bosnia and Herzegovina expatriate sportspeople in Germany
Bosnia and Herzegovina expatriate sportspeople in England
Bosnia and Herzegovina expatriate sportspeople in Croatia